Esslemont Castle is a ruined tower house in Aberdeenshire, Scotland.  It is located on the A920 west of Ellon and is designated a scheduled ancient monument.

Etymology 
The name Esslemont may be of Brittonic origin and originate with the term corresponding to Welsh iselfynydd, meaning "low hill".

History
The first mention of Esslemont is as the 'manor of Eislemont' in the 14th century.

The lands of Esslemont were passed by marriage from the family of Mareschal by marriage of the heiress Janet to Francis le Chen of Straloch in the 14th century. The castle was burnt in 1493. John Cheyne obtained a licence to rebuild from James IV in July 1500. He was permitted to build a tower as high as he liked, with iron yetts, machicolations, portcullis, drawbridges, and other "strengths". John Cheyne and his kin fought with Duncan Forbes in Aberdeen's Gallowgate in 1503.

In 1564 Patrick Cheyne was created baron of Esslemont by Queen Mary, who stayed here during her campaign against the Earl of Huntly, and a fortalice and tower were recorded in 1575–6.

The castle was then destroyed as the result of a feud between the Cheynes and the Hays.  The name of the lands, now as "Essilmounthe", appears in Scottish records in 1609.

The castle ceased to be regularly occupied in 1625, when the estate passed to the Errol family. In 1728 it became the property of Robert Gordon and may have been partially occupied till 1769, when the existing mansion, Esslemont House, was erected in its vicinity.

Excavations
The surrounding ditch may date from the 14th century. Finds from the excavation included 14/15th century potsherds, a medallion, and a worn shilling of William III.

The castle today
The castle is roofless and missing large sections of wall which were reused in building sites nearby.  Especially noticeable are the missing dressed stones of the windows.  The structure is a L Plan castle with a staircase turret and a round tower at the south-east angle. The main building seems on the ground floor to have contained the kitchen, with a wide fireplace in the north gable; the rugged edges of the ruined sides of the flue being visible high up in the gable.  Though ruined, the remains are clearly on three stories.
The Gordon Arms are visible on the exterior of the castle.

See also
Clan Gordon
Earl of Erroll

References

Castles in Aberdeenshire
Ruins in Aberdeenshire
Clan Cheyne
Scheduled Ancient Monuments in Aberdeenshire